Pedregal is a corregimiento within Panama City, in Panamá District, Panamá Province, Panama with a population of 51,641 as of 2010. Its population as of 1990 was 40,896; its population as of 2000 was 45,801.

References

Corregimientos of Panamá Province
Panamá District